Atlas Aviation is a full service FBO chain in the U.S. state of Florida. The FBO located at Peter O. Knight Airport offers fuel services, aircraft maintenance, hangar storage, tiedown, flight training and aircraft rental services. The company started in Florida in July 2004.  Atlas Aviation has owned and operated three FBO's since 2004. Atlas Aviation is currently the main FBO for both the Peter O. Knight Airport and the Plant City Airport.

External links 
 Atlas Aviation

Aircraft ground handling companies
2004 establishments in Florida